Adi Darma (Tenggarong, 29 April 1960 – Bontang, 1 October 2020) was an Indonesian politician and civil servant, member of the Golkar Party.

He served as mayor of Bontang from 2011 to 2016, but lost the 2015 elections to Neni Moerniaeni, who became the first female mayor of Bontang in March 2016.

In 2020 Darma ran for another term as mayor of Bontang, but on 23 September, during the COVID-19 pandemic in Indonesia, he tested positive for COVID-19. He was admitted to the Tama Husada Hospital in Bontang, where he died on 1 October, aged 60.

References 

1960 births
2020 deaths
People from Kutai Kartanegara Regency
Golkar politicians
Deaths from the COVID-19 pandemic in Indonesia